The Broken Crown is a 2016 Spanish historical drama film directed by Jordi Frades which stars Irene Escolar, Rodolfo Sancho and Raúl Mérida, among others. The fiction serves as bridge in between the television series Isabel and Carlos, rey emperador.

Premise 
Set in early 16th century, the fiction focuses on the events after the death and of Queen Isabella of Castile and the issuing of the corresponding will. Isabella's daughter Joanna founds herself in the middle of the political schemes of her father Ferdinand and her spouse Philip, son of Maximilian of Habsburg, with everyone in the Court having a vested interest on declaring her mad and unfit to rule.

Cast

Production 
The Broken Crown,  debut as feature film director, was written by José Luis Martín. The score was composed by Federico Jusid. The film was produced by Diagonal TV and R. Zinman Productions, with the participation of RTVE and the collaboration of Elipsis Capital. Filming started in May 2015, shooting in locations such as the Castle of Guadamur, the Cathedral of Burgos, the Cathedral of Toledo, the Church of Santa María Magdalena in Torrelaguna  and the Palace of Rincón in Madrid. Raimon Lorda worked as cinematographer whilst Carlos J. Sanavia took over film editing.

Release 
Distributed by A Contracorriente Films, the film was theatrically released in Spain on 19 February 2016.

See also 
 List of Spanish films of 2016

References

External links 
 La corona partida at ICAA's Catálogo de Cinespañol

Films set in the 16th century
2016 films
2016 drama films
Spanish drama films
2010s historical drama films
Films shot in Spain
Cultural depictions of Joanna of Castile
Films shot in the Community of Madrid
Films shot in the province of Toledo
2010s Spanish-language films
2010s Spanish films